Phyllachora cannabis is a plant pathogen infecting hemp.

References

Fungal plant pathogens and diseases
Hemp diseases
Phyllachorales